The 2018 College Nationals was the 23rd Women's College Nationals.  The College Nationals was a team handball tournament to determine the College National Champion from 2018 from the US.

The Pennsylvania State University won their first title in their first season of handball competition. They formed their team with help from the runner-up from West Point only one year ago in April.

Venues
The championship was played at two venues at the United States Military Academy in West Point, New York.

Modus

The four teams played first a round robin. Game duration 2x20min + 5min break.

The first plays against the 4th and 2nd against the 3rd of the Group stage the semis. Game duration 2x25min + 10min break.

The losers of the semis play a small final. Game duration 2x25min + 10min break.

The winners of the semis play the final. Game duration 2x30min + 10min break.

Results
Source:

Group stage

Championship

Semifinals

Small Final

Final

Final ranking

Awards
Source:

All Americans
Source:

1st team

2nd team

References

External links
 Competition Page

USA Team Handball College Nationals by year
Army Black Knights team handball